was a Japanese
statesman and one of the Three Great Nobles regarded as the main founders of modern Japan.

Ōkubo was a samurai of the Satsuma Domain and joined the movement to overthrow the ruling Tokugawa Shogunate during the Bakumatsu period. Upon the founding of the new Empire of Japan, Ōkubo became a leading member of the Meiji Restoration and a prominent member of the Meiji oligarchy. Following his return from the Iwakura Mission in 1873, he became Lord of Home Affairs and used his office's authority to rapidly expand his influence within the Restoration government. By the beginning of 1874, he had firmly established himself as the country's de facto dictator. In this capacity, he enacted numerous structural reforms, pacified disputes within the Meiji regime at the Osaka Conference of 1875, and suppressed several rebellions threatening the survival of the empire. As a result of his autocratic style of government, Ōkubo became the focus of deep animosity within Japan and was ultimately assassinated in 1878 by a former member of Saigo Takamori's rebel army.

Early life

Ōkubo was born on 26 September 1830 in Kagoshima, Satsuma Province (present-day Kagoshima Prefecture) to Ōkubo Juemon (1794-1863; also known as Toshio and Shirō), a low-ranking retainer of Shimazu Nariakira, the daimyō of the Satsuma Domain, later given a minor official position, and his wife Minayoshi Fuku (1803-1864), daughter of a physician. Although the Ōkubo family were not of high status, they were of distinguished origin, thought to descend from the noble Fujiwara clan. The eldest of five children, Ōkubo studied at the same local school as Saigō Takamori, who was three years older. In 1846, Ōkubo was given the position of aide to the Satsuma Domain's archivist.

Satsuma samurai

Shimazu Nariakira recognized Ōkubo's talents and appointed him to the position of tax administrator in 1858. When Nariakira died that year, Ōkubo joined the plot to overthrow the Tokugawa shogunate, the de facto military dictatorship that had ruled Japan as a feudal state since 1600. Unlike most Satsuma leaders, Ōkubo favored the position of tōbaku (倒幕, overthrowing the shogunate), as opposed to kōbu gattai (marital unity of the Imperial and Tokugawa families) and hanbaku (opposition to the shogunate) over the Sonnō jōi movement.

The outcome of the Anglo-Satsuma War of 1863, along with the Namamugi Incident and the September 1863 coup d'état in Kyoto, convinced Ōkubo that the tōbaku movement was doomed. In 1866, Ōkubo met with Saigō Takamori and Chōshū Domain's Kido Takayoshi to form the secret Satchō Alliance to overthrow the Tokugawa through the mediation of Sakamoto Ryōma of Tosa Domain.

Meiji restoration

On January 3, 1868, forces from Satsuma and Chōshū seized the Kyoto Imperial Palace and proclaimed the Meiji Restoration. Thereafter, 
with the help of the influential courtier, Iwakura Tomomi, the "Three Great Nobles of the Restoration" (Ōkubo, Saigō and Kido) formed a provisional government. At its inception, the Meiji regime had to rely on funds from the Tokugawa lands (which were seized in toto).

As head of the department of internal affairs, Ōkubo had a huge amount of power through his control of all local government appointments and the police force. In this capacity, he was able to appoint all new leaders within the state bureaucracy. Most of the people he appointed as governors were young men; some included  friends such as Matsukata Masayoshi while others were rare Japanese who had gained some education in Europe or the United States.

As Finance Minister in 1871, Ōkubo enacted a Land Tax Reform, the Haitōrei Edict, which prohibited samurai from wearing swords in public, and ended official discrimination against the outcasts. In foreign relations, he worked to secure revision of the unequal treaties and joined the Iwakura Mission on its round-the-world trip of 1871 to 1873. Realizing that Japan was not in any position to challenge the Western powers in its new present state, Ōkubo returned to Japan on September 13, 1873, just in time to take a strong stand against Saigō's proposed invasion of Korea (Seikanron).

Upon assuming the new position of Lord of Home Affairs in November 1873, Okubo consolidated power to become the dominant voice within the Restoration regime. As Home Lord (内務卿), Ōkubo promoted industrial development building roads, bridges, and ports—all things that the Tokugawa shogunate had refused to do.  In response to calls for a representative assembly, he presided over the Osaka Conference of 1875 to reconcile opposing views on the subject within the Meiji oligarchy. While the conference resulted in the creation of an Assembly of prefectural governors and a senate-like body called the Genro-in, the positions to such bodies were appointive rather than elective and the authority to sanction laws was denied to the latter.  In 1877, Okubo was faced with the prospect of open rebellion when forces in Satsuma under the command of his old friend, Saigo Takamori, took up arms against the Meiji regime to end its nationwide campaign of enforced modernization. Ōkubo took personal command of the government army and crushed the rebellion, thereby resulting in Saigo's death.

After suppressing a rebellion originating in his own province, many Satsuma samurai considered Ōkubo a traitor. On May 14, 1878, Ōkubo was assassinated by Shimada Ichirō and six other Kaga Domain samurai on his way to the imperial palace, only a few minutes' walk from the Sakurada gate where Ii Naosuke had been assassinated 18 years earlier.

Legacy

Ōkubo was one of the most influential leaders of the Meiji Restoration and the establishment of modern governmental structures. From November 1873, when he was made Home Affairs Minister also known as the Lords of Home Affairs (a newly created post), until his death in 1878, he was the most powerful man in Japan. A devout loyalist and nationalist, he enjoyed the respect of his colleagues and enemies alike.

Personal life
Ōkubo married Hayasaki Masako (d. 1879), with whom he had four sons and a daughter. His children from this marriage were Toshikazu, the 1st Marquess Ōkubo (1859–1945), Makino Nobuaki (1861–1949), Toshitake, later the 2nd Marquess (1867–1943), Ishihara Takeguma (1869–1943), who was adopted by his wife Yaeko's family, and Yoshiko, who married Ijuin Hikokichi.

Ōkubo's second son, Makino Nobuaki, and his son-in-law Ijuin Hikokichi served as Foreign Minister. Future Prime Minister of Japan Tarō Asō and Princess Tomohito of Mikasa are great-great-grandchildren of Ōkubo Toshimichi.

In 1884, Toshikazu was ennobled as a marquess in the new peerage in honour of his father's achievements. He married Shigeno Naoko (1875–1918), but had no children and relinquished the title in 1928 in favour of his younger brother Toshitake (1865–1943). A graduate of Yale and Heidelberg universities, Toshitake successively served as governor of Tottori (1900), Ōita (1901–1905), Saitama (1905–1907) and Osaka (1912–1917) prefectures. He married Kondō Sakae (1879–1956) and had three children, Toshiaki (1900–1995), Toshimasa (1902–1945) and Michitada (1907–????). Toshiaki became a prominent professor of Japanese history and succeeded as the 3rd Marquess in 1943, holding the title until the peerage was abolished in 1947. He subsequently became the librarian of the National Diet Library from 1951 to 1953 and then taught as a lecturer and professor of history at Nagoya University (1953–1959) and at Rikkyū University (1959–1965). He was awarded the Asahi Prize in 1993, two years before his death. He married Yoneda Yaeko (1910–????) and had two children, Yasushi (b. 1934) and Shigeko (b. 1936). Yasushi married Matsudaira Naoko (b. 1940) and had a daughter, Akiko (b. 1965).

Ōkubo also had four illegitimate children by a mistress.

In fiction 
In the manga/anime series Rurouni Kenshin, Ōkubo Toshimichi appears to seek Himura Kenshin's assistance in destroying the threat posed by the revolt of Shishio Makoto. Kenshin is uncertain, and Ōkubo gives him a May 14 deadline to make his decision. On his way to seek Kenshin's answer on that day, he is supposedly assassinated by Seta Sōjirō, Shishio's right-hand man, and the Ichirō clan desecrates his corpse and claim they killed him. (Watsuki makes a comparison to President of the United States, Abraham Lincoln, with Ōkubo in his notes).

In Boris Akunin's novel The Diamond Chariot, Erast Fandorin investigates the plot to assassinate Ōkubo but fails to prevent the assassination.

Honours
Junior First Rank (May 22, 1901; posthumous)

Notes

References
 Beasley, William G.  (1990). The Rise of Modern Japan: Political, Economic and Social Change Since 1850. New York: St. Martin's Press.   (cloth)
Iwata, Masukazu. (1964).  Ōkubo Toshimichi: The Bismarck of Japan. Berkeley: University of California Press (1964). ASIN: B000FFQUIG
 Jansen, Marius B. (2000). The Making of Modern Japan. Cambridge: Harvard University Press. ;  OCLC 44090600
 Nish, Ian. (1998) The Iwakura Mission to America and Europe: A New Assessment. Richmond, Surrey: Japan Library. 	; ;  OCLC 40410662
 Reischauer, Edwin O. and Haru M. Reischauer. Samurai and Silk: A Japanese and American Heritage. Cambridge: Harvard University Press, 1986. .
 Weston, Mark, Giants of Japan: The Lives of Japan's Greatest Men and Women, Kodansha, 1999

Further reading
Iwata, Masakazu. Okubo Toshimichi, the Bismarck of Japan. Berkeley: University of California Press, 1964.
Sagers, John H. Origins of Japanese Wealth and Power: Reconciling Confucianism and Capitalism, 1830–1885. 1st ed. New York: Palgrave Macmillan, 2006.

External links

Kagoshima Information

National Diet Library Photo & Bio
Yomiuri Shimbun:  Less than 30% of primary school students in Japan know historical significance of Ōkubo, 2008.

1830 births
1878 deaths
People from Kagoshima
Assassinated Japanese politicians
Japanese revolutionaries
Nobles of the Meiji Restoration
People of Meiji-period Japan
People from Satsuma Domain
Samurai
Shimazu retainers
Deified Japanese people
Members of the Iwakura Mission